Shekaruyeh (also Romanized as Shekarūyeh; also known as Shakaru, Shekaroo, and Shekarū) is a village in Moqam Rural District, Shibkaveh District, Bandar Lengeh County, Hormozgan Province, Iran. At the 2006 census, its population was 133, in 29 families.

References 

Populated places in Bandar Lengeh County